The Postgraduate Institute of Science (PGIS) is a graduate school of the University of Peradeniya in Sri Lanka. It was established in 1996. The institution functions as a semi-autonomous unit within the University of Peradeniya. The PGIS offers several programmes, namely, Postgraduate Diploma, M.Sc., M.Phil. and Ph.D.

References

External links
Official website

University of Peradeniya
Graduate schools in Sri Lanka